The American Cornhole Organization (ACO) is an American organization for the sport of cornhole. Based in Camp Dennison, Ohio, the ACO was founded in 2005 by Frank Geers. It is a governing body for cornhole, runs and promotes Professional & Recreational Cornhole tournaments and leagues through its nationwide network of ACO Certified Officials. The ACO has formalized official cornhole rules, has established a system for cornhole players handicap and established the ACO World Rankings for the sport of cornhole.

American Cornhole Historic Markers  
 King of Cornhole TV Pilot Summer 2006 
 ACO Cornhole First Singles Competition Summer 2006 
 ACO Introduces Resin Filled Cornhole Bags Fall 2006
 AC Introduces Airmail Box 2007 
 ACO Unveils First National Cornhole Ranking System - SCR Score Spring 2007
 ACO PRO Jersey introduced at Easter Seals Tailgate Bash World Championships August 2007
 ACO Adds World Ranking Points System featuring CornyForty - Top 40 Cornhole Players Spring 2008
 ACO Introduces PlayersChoice Tournament Series Bags - two sided playing surface Winter 2009
 AC Publishes HoleMagazine.com News and Views of Cornhole Summer 2009
 ACO Introduces SocialSixty - List of Top Non Pro Cornhole Players Winter 2010
 AC "Star Logo" Tournament Series Cornhole Boards star in Cornhole the Movie 2010
 ACO Introduces - ACO Certified Officials & Sanctioned Cornhole Events Summer 2010
 ACO teams with Hometown Sports Television and Audiocom Productions to present ACO World Championships of Cornhole V for live online streaming event February 2011
 Topps Company presents 2011 Allen & Ginter's World Champions Collector's Edition. Includes first Official Cornhole Collector's card featuring Matt Guy, reigning 5-time ACO King of Cornhole Summer 2011
 ACO World Championships of Cornhole featured on ESPN's Kenny Mayne Wider World of Sports Summer 2013
 ACO World Championships of Cornhole featured on ESPN SportsCenter on the Road w/ Matt Barrie & Sara Walsh Summer 2015
 World Cornhole Day - last Saturday of July - Official Proclamation in Columbia, SC in 2020

References

External links 
American Cornhole Organization Website

Sports governing bodies in the United States
Privately held companies based in Ohio